The Pontiac Grand Am is a mid-size car and later a compact car that was produced by Pontiac. The Grand Am had two separate three-year runs in the 1970s: from 1973 to 1975, and again from 1978 to 1980. It was based on the GM A platform. Production of the intermediate sized Grand Am was canceled in 1980 when it was replaced by the Pontiac 6000. The compact-sized Grand Am was reintroduced in 1985 when it replaced the Pontiac Phoenix. It became Pontiac's best selling car and was later replaced by the Pontiac G6, so named as it was intended to be the 6th generation of the Grand Am.

All 1973–1975 Grand Ams were built in Pontiac, Michigan at Pontiac's main assembly plant. The 1978-1980 Grand Ams were built in Pontiac, Michigan at Pontiac's main assembly plant and in Atlanta, Georgia at GMAD Lakewood. All Grand Ams between 1985 and 2005 were built in Lansing, Michigan at the Lansing Car Assembly.

1973–1975

The history of Grand Am begins with Pontiac executives noting incursion into the US market by Mercedes, BMW, Toyota and Nissan. Notably, the American sports car was usually without luxury features, and the luxury car without sport features. Foreign makes mixed these features, that introduced the market to luxury performance coupes and sedans that had balanced handling along with powerful engines. Pontiac hybridized the Grand Prix with the Trans Am to create the Grand Am, a naming tactic shared with the luxury Pontiac Grand Ville. Built on the A-body platform shared with the Pontiac LeMans, the intended GTO body was re-badged and fitted with the top-level Grand Prix interior, and using the larger engine from the Grand Prix, Bonneville and Grand Ville.

The original Grand Am was introduced in the fall of 1972 as a 1973 model. It was based on the GM A platform (A-body) along with other cars such as the Chevrolet Chevelle Laguna, Oldsmobile Cutlass Supreme, and the Buick Century Gran Sport. The GM A-body platform had major design revisions in 1973 that included the elimination of pillarless hardtops due to proposed Federal rollover standards, but with frameless windows similar to that of a hardtop. No convertibles were produced due to the rollover standards (that were not enacted).

The 1973 oil crisis caused a dichotomy of buyers: total luxury or total economy. Since Grand Am was an "in-between", its sales declined and the model was discontinued in 1975.

1973

The Grand Am, coined by Pontiac with a name derived from two other cars in its lineup ("Grand" signifying "Grand Prix luxury" and "Am" for "Trans Am performance") was designed as America's answer to European luxury/sport sedans and available as a four-door Colonnade sedan or a two-door Colonnade coupe. A total of 43,136 Grand Ams were built during the first year of production.

The Grand Am could be had with a standard 2-bbl  V8 engine with single exhaust producing , an optional 4-bbl version of this engine with single exhaust producing  that was only available with a 4-speed manual transmission, an optional 4-bbl version of this engine with dual exhaust producing , or an optional 4-bbl  with dual exhaust . The engine displacement, expressed in liters, was displayed on the bootlid in an effort to accentuate the car's supposedly European character.

All engines were available with a Turbo-hydramatic 400 automatic transmission as standard equipment. A 4-speed manual transmission was available with the 400/4-bbl engine in 1973 and 1974, but this was not popular.

The 1973 Pontiac Grand Am style had a unique flexible urethane front fascia center nose (known as the 'Endura' nose) that was squeezable and could return to its original shape following a minor collision along with the new energy-absorbing bumpers, a total of six grille openings with vertical bars, round front turn signals with a cross-hair design, horizontal rear taillights, and chrome rear bumper. Additionally, Grand Ams featured a Radial Tuned Suspension (RTS) as standard equipment that included radial-ply tires, Pliacell shock absorbers, and front and rear sway bars. The springs were advertised as being computer selected. The Grand Am was one of only three GM cars to have standard radial tires and appropriate suspension tuning in 1973, with the others being the Oldsmobile Cutlass Salon and Chevrolet Monte Carlo S.

The Grand Am included Strato bucket seats upholstered in Naugahyde vinyl or corduroy cloth featuring manual recliners and adjustable lumbar supports - both features common on European-style sports/luxury sedans, but unusual for American cars of that time. Also included were an instrument panel from the Pontiac Grand Prix featuring a Rally gauge cluster with fuel, oil, water and volt gauges (a tachometer or fuel economy gauge was optional, and on cars so equipped, the clock was moved to a space on the lower instrument panel under the radio), three-spoke padded steering wheel with brushed-stainless spokes, and Genuine Crossfire African Mahogany trim on the dash facing, radio and clock surrounds, as well as the center console between the front seats. Grand Ams also were among the first U.S.-built cars with a turn-signal mounted headlight dimmer switch that had been common on imported cars for decades. Other standard equipment included concealed windshield wipers, a  front stabilizer bar, and an in-the-windshield radio antenna. Upscale options included air conditioning, tinted glass, power windows-locks-seat, rear defogger, various sound systems, and tilt-steering-wheel. AM/FM stereo with a tape player was optional. The listed retail price for the 2-door coupe was US$4,264 ($ in  dollars ), listing it above the Firebird Trans Am.

Pontiac also produced a single 1973 Grand Am station wagon as a feasibility study. This was a LeMans wagon converted to a Grand Am. A functional ram-air induction system was developed for the Pontiac A-bodies utilizing twin NACA openings in the hood, but the option was dropped due to the inability to pass federally mandated drive-by noise standards. A few functional Ram Air systems were sold over the counter. The twin-scoop NACA hood was an option for any Pontiac A-body for all three years, but was non-functional.

In a Popular Mechanics Owners survey, 67% rated the build quality as good to excellent and 79% liked the handling. However, 22.1% disliked the fuel economy.

1974

Described as "The mid-sized Pontiac with Foreign Intrigue ... American Ingenuity" on the front cover of the four-page 1974 Grand Am brochure that featured a green four-door sedan, only minor styling changes highlighted this year's model including a redesigned nose and grille with 12 openings with horizontal bars. The 1974 Grand Am's rear-end styling was redesigned for the new 5 mph crash standards and had vertical rear taillights with relocated license plate and fuel filler above the bumper. Engine and transmission offerings were the same as 1973, but four-speed manual transmissions were no longer offered in California, where only the Turbo Hydra-matic automatic was available. Inside, the genuine African crossfire mahogany trim on the instrument panel was replaced by a simulated material due to delamination problems on the 1973 models but the real wood was continued on the center console, optional console clock, and radio bezel.

Engine choices were  2-barrel single exhaust producing , 400 cubic inch 4-barrel single exhaust producing , 400 cubic inch 4-barrel dual exhaust producing , and 455 cubic inch 4-barrel dual exhaust producing .

Sales were down more than 50 percent due to the 1973 oil crisis, and while the recession continued, prices increased for all 1974 model cars. Only 17,083 Grand Ams were built.

1975
The 1975 Grand Am looked the same as the 1974 model, but had vertical front grille bars, a body-colored rear bumper, and a catalytic converter single-exhaust, which mandated the use of unleaded fuel, along with GM's High Energy Ignition and other items promoted as part of Pontiac's maximum mileage system. In addition to the standard roofline with louvered rear side windows, Grand Am coupes with the optional vinyl roof could be ordered with a full triangular rear side window or a vertical opera window similar to that found on the Grand Prix.

Inside, the Strato bucket seats received revised vertical trim patterns, the adjustable lumbar support controls were dropped, and only the passenger seat had a recliner, a "safety practice" which would continue at GM for a decade. New this year as a no-cost option was a 60/40 bench seat with a center armrest.

Engines were also detuned to meet the 1975 emission regulations with the compression ratio dropping to a new low of 7.6 to 1 on some engines. Standard was the   V8 with two-barrel carburetor, optional were a  400, or a   - both with four-barrel carburetors. Turbo Hydra-matic was standard equipment and the only transmission offered this year. Performance from 0-60 was 7.7 seconds.

A total of 10,679 Grand Ams were built in 1975 and the series was dropped after this year due to declining sales and rising gas prices as a result of the 1973 oil crisis. Another factor leading to the Grand Am's cancellation were plans for all 1976 Pontiac A-body cars receiving the newly approved rectangular headlights, which would necessitate a complete redesign of the Grand Am's Endura nose and Pontiac officials decided that the expense of such a redesign could not be justified based on low production numbers. The basic GM A-body design remained until 1977.

Production

Engines
1973–1975  V8 with 2-barrel carburetor (standard engine, others were optional)
1973–1975  V8 with 4-barrel carburetor
1973–1974  V8 with 4-barrel carburetor, 4-speed (not available in California)
1973–1975  V8 with 4-barrel carburetor

Notes:
A SD-455 equipped engineering prototype Grand Am was built and tested, but was later dismantled and destroyed.
1973 engines may have point or unitized ignition.
1974 engines may have point or unitized ignition or starting around May 1, 1974, HEI ignition.
1975 engines have HEI ignition.
1975 was the first year for the catalytic converter.

1978–1980

1978

For 1978 the Grand Am nameplate returned on a downsized model using the Grand Prix's G platform. It was offered in both two- and four-door models featuring a vertical bar grille and other trimmings to differentiate it from the LeMans, upon which it was based. Like the 1973-1975 models, this generation of Grand Ams also featured standard radial tires plus an upgraded Radial Tuned Suspension with front and rear sway bars. Interiors were similar to the Grand LeMans with either a standard notchback bench seat, optional 60/40 bench or Strato bucket seats with console and recliner on passenger side, an optional tachometer, and a choice of either cloth or "Morrokide" vinyl upholstery.

Standard equipment included power steering, power front disc brakes, Turbo Hydra-matic transmission, full instrumentation and Pontiac's  V8 engine with two-barrel carburetor producing . Optional was a 4-bbl  version, along with numerous extra cost items such as snowflake wheels, whitewall or white-lettered tires, power windows and seats, tilt steering wheel, sunroof, and cruise control.

1979

Very few changes were made for 1979 other than the normal trim revisions and the demotion of the standard powertrain to a Buick  V6 and floor-mounted three-speed manual transmission as standard equipment. In terms of appearance, the only difference was that the park/signal and marker lenses were changed to amber ones.

New for 1979 was a four-speed manual available with the 150-horsepower 301 four-barrel in 49 states.

The wood-grained instrument panel was replaced by brushed aluminum trim, while the gauge faces changed from silver with black letters and numbers to black with white letters and numbers. The same seating choices in either cloth or Morrokide trims were offered including the standard notchback bench seat, or optional 60/40 bench or Strato bucket seats with console. An AM/FM CB radio combo was available and a heated rear window was optional.

In 1979, the Grand Am was featured in the NASCAR Grand National circuit.

1980
The year 1980 was the finale for the second-generation Grand Am. The four-door sedan was dropped, leaving only the two-door coupe, which received only minor appearance changes. Strato bucket seats in cloth or Morrokide upholstery were standard equipment along with a center console with floor shifter for the Turbo Hydra-matic transmission.

The V6 engine, two-barrel V8s and manual transmissions were dropped leaving the four-barrel Pontiac 301 V8 with  the only engine offered in 49 states or, in California, the  Chevrolet 305 V8. Slow sales of the Grand Am led to its discontinuation after the 1980 model year.

In the first year of the NASCAR Busch Series (1982) the championship was won by Jack Ingram in a 1980 Grand Am.

1985–1991

For the 1985 model year, Pontiac reused the Grand Am name for a new compact car to replace the aging and unpopular Phoenix (based on GM's X Body) using the new-for-1985 N Body. The Grand Am shared the same front-wheel drive platform as the Buick Somerset (renamed Skylark in 1987) and the Oldsmobile Calais (renamed Cutlass Calais in 1988). Initially, the Grand Am was available in base or LE trim in coupes only. The 2.5 L Tech IV was standard, while a 3.0 L Buick V6 was optional. A 5-speed manual was standard, and a 3-speed automatic was optional, the latter required if the V6 engine was ordered. In 1986, a sedan and sportier SE trim were added. The SE trim had the V6 engine standard, lower body cladding, composite headlamps, a slightly revised interior with the different cloth used on all seats and door panel inserts, analog instrumentation (base and LE models had digital), and included 14-inch aluminum wheels.

1987 models brought more power to the base engine, and a new Turbocharged four-cylinder engine taken from the Sunbird GT. The 2.0 L turbo engine became the base engine for the SE model for 1987. Cars with the turbo engine received a turbo boost gauge in the place of the voltmeter. A test by Popular Mechanics for quarter-mile acceleration with the Turbo engine resulted with the 5-speed manual taking 15.73 seconds and 16.02 seconds with the automatic transmission. They noted large amounts of torque steer from a dead stop. This was also the last year that the Buick sourced 3.0 L engine would be available in the Grand Am, as it was discontinued in mid-1987. New for styling were composite front headlights, but only on the LE models.

For 1988, front seat belts were moved from the b-pillars to the doors, to meet the passive restraint mandate for 1989. The Quad-4 LD2 engine became available for Grand Am's in 1988, replacing the previous model year's 3.0 L V6 on the options list. It is worth noting that 'Sport buckets' borrowed from the Trans Am GTA, were added to the options list this year for SE's. Other options included a Driver Information Center, an electric trunk release, and a moon roof. The base model was dropped after this model year.

A totally new front and rear fascia along with an interior redesign for 1989. The 2.5 L gained balance shafts and an increase of power. The 2.3 L 'LD2' Quad 4 replaced the 2.0 L Turbo engine as standard equipment in the SE midway through the year. This was the final year that the 'Sport Bucket' seats were available to SEs.

The 2.3 L LG0 Quad 4 was announced as being available late in the model year on Grand Am SE's with only 200 were built. All 1989 LG0 Quad 4 Grand Am's were red on grey coupes, with standard appointments including (but not limited to) 16-inch machined-face wheels. The 16-inch wheels were only optional to SE's. This would be the first year that the Grand A-inch could be ordered with either 16-inch wheels or a factory-installed CD player.

NHSTA safety ratings for frontal crashes are as follows: Driver: 3-stars; Passenger: 4-stars.

Changes were minor for 1990 and 1991; 
For 1990, a new High-Output version of the Quad 4 (mated to only a 5-speed manual) became the standard engine for the SE. Opting for the automatic transmission changed the engine to the less powerful LD2 Quad 4. The 16-inch wheels moved from the option list to standard equipment for the SE's this year. The LE gained a 'Sport Performance Package' (RPO: W32) late in the 1990 model year run. The W32 option included SE ground effects (minus wheel well flares), the same standard (as well as optional) "SE" drive train, 14-inch aluminum wheels, a larger front larger sway bar, and a rear swaybar that were only otherwise available on the SE model. 1991 was the final model year of this body style and it was essentially a carry-over year. The only changes were the addition of an Anti-lock Brakes System (ABS) as standard equipment for all Grand Am SE's (not available to LE's), and all 1991 model year cars fitted with a 5-speed transmission received a redesigned "short throw" shifter.

For 1992 the Grand Am entered its fourth generation.

Available engines:
1985–1991: 2.5 L Tech IV TBI I4 engine: 90 hp 1985-86,  MPG EPA City/Hwy/Overall 21/29/23(w/3-speed auto) 1987–88,  MPG EPA City/Hwy/Overall 21/28/23 1989–91.
1985–mid-1987: 3.0 L Buick LN7 V6 engine with MPFI: ,  of torque
mid-1987-1989: 2.0 L MPFI turbocharged I4 engine: ,  of torque, Maximum Boost 10 PSI,MPG: EPA City/Hwy 18/27
1988–1991: 2.3 L LD2 Quad 4 MPFI I4 engine: ,  of torque
1989–1991: 2.3 L LG0 Quad 4 HO MPFI I4 engine: ,  of torque
Available transmissions:
1985–1991: Isuzu sourced 5-speed manual with overdrive (2.5-liter only)
1988–1991: Muncie sourced, Getrag designed 5-speed manual with overdrive (Quad 4 only)
1985–1991: 3T40 3-speed automatic (not available on HO Quad 4)

1992–1998

For 1992 the Grand Am's chassis was widened to match the Corsica's; the suspension and braking systems are about eighty percent in common. On the SE, an anti-lock braking system (ABS VI) was available. It also received new bodywork and a revised interior. A V6 option returned in the form of the  3.3 L 3300 V6, mated to a three-speed transmission. The 2.3 L I4 came as either a SOHC or DOHC. A high output version of the DOHC was offered as well. A new GT trim was offered that featured new wheels, smoother, yet larger cladding, and more standard equipment.

1993 brought further refinement to the Quad 4. In 1994, the V6 and standard 3-speed powertrain were effectively replaced by GM's new 3.1 L 3100 series V6 engine and new 4-speed automatic transmission. A driver's side airbag also became standard for 1994, but the door-mounted automatic seatbelts remained. In 1995, the Quad 4 engines received balance shafts and direct driven power steering off the intake camshaft. The 4-speed automatic that was mated to the 3.1 L in 1994 became optional as a step-up from the 3-speed for 1995 on the new Quad 4 engine.

In Japan, this generation was officially imported by Yanase and Suzuki with left-hand drive. The main imports were the SE and V6 models. The V6 model, however, was only offered for the 1996 model year there. All models had a three-speed (later 4-speed) automatic transmission.

1996–1998

For 1996, the Grand Am received a mid-generation facelift. Outside, an updated front fascia, rear fascia, and side skirts gave the Grand Am a smoother, more rounded look. The interior was redesigned and featured dual airbags, easier to use audio system and HVAC controls, and softer plastics. The Quad 4 was replaced by a new 'Twin Cam' 2.4 L DOHC (Dual Over Head Cam) four-cylinder engine. Still based on the Quad 4, this was a re-engineered version of the previous year's 2.3 L with SFI fuel injection. The new engine made  of torque at lower rpm than the older 2.3 L. The 3.1 L V6 remained optional. The 3-speed automatic was dropped for 1996, and the 4-speed automatic featured standard traction control. Daytime running lamps with automatic lighting control were newly standard on all Grand Ams. 1997 models featured standard air conditioning. The Grand Am was redesigned for 1999.

Available engines:
 1992–1994: 2.3 L SOHC L40 L4. 120 hp (115 in 1993 and 1994),  of torque
 1992–1994: 2.3 L DOHC Quad 4 L4 engine: 160 hp (155 in 1993 and 1994),  of torque
 1992–1994: 2.3 L DOHC Quad 4 HO L4 engine: 180 hp (175 in 1993 and 1994),  of torque
 1992–1993: 3.3 L 3300 MPFI V6: ,  of torque
 1994–1998: 3.1 L 3100 SFI V6: ,  of torque
 1995: 2.3 L DOHC Quad 4 L4 engine: ,  of torque
 1996–1998: 2.4 L DOHC Twin Cam L4 engine: ,  of torque

Available transmissions:
1992–1994: Muncie sourced Getrag designed 5-speed manual with overdrive ('Quad 4 HO' only)
1992–1998: Isuzu sourced 5-speed manual with overdrive (1992-1994 'Quad OHC' only; 1995-1998 'Quad4' & 'Twin Cam' only)
1992–1995: 3T40 3-speed automatic
1994–1998: 4T60-E 4-speed automatic with overdrive (available with 3100 SFI V6 beginning in 1994)

1999–2005

Available in late spring 1998, the basic design of the fifth-generation Grand Am was shared with the Oldsmobile Alero (also new for 1999) and Chevrolet Malibu (introduced in 1996). The length was shortened slightly, but the wheelbase grew by more than three inches (76 mm). The suspension was now fully independent, with a revised MacPherson-Strut design upfront. The rear suspension is a more refined Multi-link design. The new Grand Am was offered in five trim levels: SE, SE1, SE2, GT, and GT1. GM's 3400 V6, previously exclusive to their minivans, became available as an option on the SE and SE1 and was standard on all other trim levels. For 1999, all the Grand Ams featured a 4-speed automatic transmission. The GT and GT1 also included 4-wheel disc brakes, and all Grand Ams until 2003 included standard ABS and Traction Control (made optional on SE from 2003). The GTs also had a Ram Air induction system, providing an extra five horsepower and 5 lb/ft of torque over the 3.4 L V6 when installed in any of the SE-level trims. 

The 2000 models added a Getrag 5-speed manual transmission as standard equipment with the four-cylinder. On GT models, the badge on the front fenders now read "RamAir V6", instead of "V6H.O." on 1999 GT's. ASC Creative Services designed the Grand Am SC/T for the SEMA show circuit, which was the concept design for the Ram Air hood and body package. The SC/T later became an appearance package, beginning in 2003. A road test by Car and Driver showed a 0-60 mph time of 7.7 seconds in a GT sedan with an automatic.

For 2001, the SE2 trim level was dropped, a new family of Delco stereos and new wheel designs was introduced. The radio size in 2001 also changed from a 1.5 DIN size to a full 2 DIN size. Changes for 2002 also included a stationary cup holder in the center console as opposed to a removable one.

The body cladding on SE models was removed in 2003, a change which affected other models throughout Pontiac. Also in 2003, anti-lock brakes and traction control were made optional on the SE. In 2004, an MP3 player was added to the uplevel CD player. In 2005, Pontiac began phasing out the Grand Am lineup for the new G6 replacement. SE sedans were retained for fleet sale and GT coupes were the last Grand Am model available for public sale.

Available engines:
1999–2002: 2.4 L DOHC Twin Cam L4 (LD9 model) engine: ,  of torque
2002–2005: 2.2 L DOHC Ecotec L4 engine: ,  of torque
1999–2005: 3.4 L 3400 OHV V6: 170 hp,(175 for GT)  of torque (205 for GT)

Available transmissions:
1999–2005: 4-speed automatic with overdrive (4T40-E for four-cylinder engines, 4T45-E for V6 engines)
2000–2005: Getrag 5-speed manual with overdrive (four-cylinder engines only)

Safety
The Insurance Institute for Highway Safety (IIHS) gives the 1999-2005 Grand Am a "Poor" rating in its frontal crash test for marginal structural integrity, a possible head injury, a potential right leg injury, and poor dummy control.

2003 National Highway Traffic Safety Administration (NHTSA) Crash Test Ratings (coupe):
Frontal Driver: 
Frontal Passenger: 
Side Driver: 
Side Rear Passenger: 
Rollover: 

2003 National Highway Traffic Safety Administration (NHTSA) Crash Test Ratings (sedan):
Frontal Driver: 
Frontal Passenger: 
Side Driver: 
Side Rear Passenger: 
Rollover:

Sales

References

External links

73-77 GM A-bodies including Grand Am
Grand Am Owners Club

Grand Am
Compact cars
Mid-size cars
Coupés
Sedans
Front-wheel-drive vehicles
Rear-wheel-drive vehicles
Cars introduced in 1973

1980s cars
1990s cars
2000s cars
Vehicles built in Lansing, Michigan
Motor vehicles manufactured in the United States